Dr. Clyde Carroll House, on Dead Man's Cave Rd. in White Mills, Kentucky is a historic house built in 1903.  It was listed on the National Register of Historic Places in 1988.

It is a two-story log and frame house with a one-story attached commercial building.   It was built originally as a double pen log structure in c. 1840.  It was expanded into side passage plan style in 1903, including with addition of a one-story rear frame ell.  It has a one-story porch with Doric-style columns.

It was deemed "notable for its association with the White Mills resort complex and as an intact example of a rural doctor's office and
residence."

References

Houses on the National Register of Historic Places in Kentucky
Houses completed in 1903
National Register of Historic Places in Hardin County, Kentucky
1903 establishments in Kentucky
Side passage plan architecture in the United States
Double pen architecture in the United States
Healthcare in Kentucky
Houses in Hardin County, Kentucky